A searchlight is a device to illuminate the sky while searching for aircraft.

Searchlight may also refer to:

Arts and entertainment
 Search-Light, a publication by William George Jordan
 Searchlight (album), a 1989 album by Runrig
 Searchlight (magazine), a British anti-fascist magazine
 Searchlight (short story), a 1962 science fiction short story by Robert A. Heinlein
 Searchlights (album), a 2009 album by Abandon
 "Searchlights", a song by Falling Up from the album Dawn Escapes

Businesses and organizations
 Searchlight Pictures, a film studio.
 Searchlight Capital Partners, a private equity firm
 Searchlight BBS, developer of Searchlight BBS software (SLBBS)

Other uses
 Operation Searchlight, a military pacification program carried out by the Pakistan Army in 1971, in Bangladesh
 Searchlight (workshops), workshops and home founded by Matron Powell in Denton, Sussex
 Searchlight, Nevada, a town in Clark County, Nevada, United States
 Searchlight Airport
 Searchlight signal, a type of railway signal
 Searchlight, an annual Canadian music competition mounted by CBC Music

See also
 Spotlight (disambiguation)
 Search (disambiguation)
 Light (disambiguation)